The 2020 Mississippi State Bulldogs baseball team represented Mississippi State University in the 2020 NCAA Division I baseball season. The Bulldogs played their home games at Dudy Noble Field, Polk–DeMent Stadium.

Previous season

The Bulldogs finished 52–15 overall, and 20–10 in the conference. They participated in the 2019 College World Series

Preseason

SEC Coaches poll
The SEC coaches poll was released on February 6, 2020 with the Tigers predicted to finish tied for third in the Western Division.

Schedule and results

Schedule Source:
*Rankings are based on the team's current ranking in the D1Baseball poll.

Rankings

MLB Draft
There were only 5 rounds in the 2020 draft.
†Competitive Balance Round A
‡J.T. Ginn was drafted out of high school as the 30th overall pick but honored his commitment to Mississippi State. He had Tommy John surgery in March 2020.

References

Mississippi State
Mississippi State Bulldogs baseball seasons
Mississippi State Bulldogs baseball